Bolshoye Ivanovskoye is a rural locality (a village) in Ugolskoye Rural Settlement, Sheksninsky District, Vologda Oblast, Russia. The population was 29 as of 2002. There are 2 streets.

Geography 
Bolshoye Ivanovskoye is located 18 km southeast of Sheksna (the district's administrative centre) by road. Pokrovskoye is the nearest rural locality.

References 

Rural localities in Sheksninsky District